Ivan Buva (born May 6, 1991) is a Croatian professional basketball player currently playing for the Shiga Lakes of the Japanese first-tier B.League. Standing at 2.08 m, he plays at the center position.

Professional career
During his career, Buva has played in Croatia, Bosnia and Herzegovina, Italy, Spain, China and Turkey.

On May 3, 2018, Buva signed with Valencia Basket in Spain for the rest of the 2017–18 season.

On July 31, 2018, Buva signed a lucrative contract with Anhui Dragons in China.

In September 2018 Buva signed a one-year deal with the Turkish side Beşiktaş Sompo Japan Istanbul.

On September 30, 2019, he has signed with Monaco of the LNB Pro A.

On October 29, 2019, he has signed with Gaziantep Basketbol of the Turkish Basketball Super League (BSL).

On January 12, 2021, he signed with JL Bourg Basket of the French League. After playing seven matches for Bourg, in February 2021, he signed with Rytas Vilnius of the Lithuanian League.

References

External links
Eurobasket.com Profile 
Pallacanestrocantu.com Profile  
FIBA profile

1991 births
Anhui Dragons players
Beşiktaş men's basketball players
Bilbao Basket players
Centers (basketball)
Croatian expatriate basketball people in Bosnia and Herzegovina
Croatian expatriate basketball people in China
Croatian expatriate basketball people in Italy
Croatian expatriate basketball people in Spain
Croatian expatriate basketball people in Turkey
Croatian men's basketball players
Gaziantep Basketbol players
HKK Široki players
İstanbul Büyükşehir Belediyespor basketball players
KK Cedevita players
Liga ACB players
Living people
Pallacanestro Cantù players
Power forwards (basketball)
S.S. Felice Scandone players
Basketball players from Zagreb
Valencia Basket players
BC Rytas players
Shiga Lakes players